Martina Grunert (later Koch then Abresch; born 17 May 1949 in Leipzig) is a retired German swimmer who participated in the 1964 and 1968 Summer Olympics. As a part of the 4 × 100 m freestyle relay team she was sixth in 1964 and won a silver medal in 1968. Her best individual achievement was fifth place in 100 m freestyle in 1968. She also won two gold medals in the European Aquatics Championships: 100 m freestyle (1966) and 200 m medley (1970).

References

1949 births
Living people
German female freestyle swimmers
Olympic swimmers of the United Team of Germany
Olympic swimmers of East Germany
Olympic silver medalists for East Germany
Swimmers at the 1964 Summer Olympics
Swimmers at the 1968 Summer Olympics
Medalists at the 1968 Summer Olympics
European Aquatics Championships medalists in swimming
Swimmers from Leipzig
21st-century German women
20th-century German women